Islamic Fiqh Academy (India) (IFA) is a Fiqh (Islamic law) institute in New Delhi, established in 1989. It was registered as a charitable trust in 1990. Mujahidul Islam Qasmi was its founder and secretary general until his death. The academy is a registered NGO working as a research-oriented organization since then.

Services
It has issued statements on aspects of Islamic religious observance such as medical treatment during the Ramadan fast, and on sex education, mixed-sex education and organ donation. It has issued a number of published works, including an Urdu translation of the Encyclopedia of Islamic Jurisprudence. The Academy has been described as "the most recent and, in many ways, the most sophisticated articulation so far of claims to institutionalized Islamic authority in India".

Membership
The membership includes a large number of young graduates (Fazils) from madrasas including Darul Uloom Deoband, Darul Uloom Nadwatul Ulama and Firangi Mahal in Lucknow. The academy coordinates with other academic and Fiqh institutions in the Middle East and in countries and areas with a significant Muslim minority population, such as the USA and Europe.

See also 
 List of Deobandi organisations
 Deobandi fiqh

References

External links
 Islamic Fiqh Academy

Deobandi fiqh
1988 establishments in Delhi
Educational organisations based in India
Deobandi organisations